William Murdoch (1754–1839) was a Scottish engineer and inventor.

William Murdoch may also refer to:

 William Murdoch (poet) (1823–1887), Canadian poet
 Billy Murdoch (1854–1911), Australian cricket's greatest batsman of the 19th century
 Billy Murdoch (footballer) (born 1949), Scottish footballer for Stenhousemuir and Kilmarnock
 William Gordon Burn Murdoch (1862–1939), Scottish painter, travel writer and explorer
 William McMaster Murdoch (1873–1912), RMS Titanic First Officer
 William Murdoch (pianist) (1888–1942), Australian concert pianist
 William Murdoch (politician) (1904–1984), Speaker of the Ontario Legislature, 1960–1963
 W.C.W. Murdoch (1914–1987), Scottish rugby player
 William W. Murdoch (born 1939), professor of population ecology at the University of California, Santa Barbara
 William Murdoch (bishop) (born 1949), American Anglican bishop

In fiction
 Detective William Murdoch, the investigator in Murdoch Mysteries

See also
 William Murdock (c. 1720–1769), Maryland colonial rights proponent